YNG can refer to:

 YNG, IATA code for Youngstown–Warren Regional Airport in Ohio
 Yng or Yngvi, an older name for Freyr in Norse mythology